Frederick Stephenson (1871 – 21 April 1944) was a New Zealand cricketer. He played first-class cricket for Canterbury, Otago and Wellington between 1890 and 1905.

Stephenson was a right-arm off-spin bowler. His best bowling figures were 7 for 58 (all bowled) and 5 for 28 in Wellington's loss to Canterbury in 1902–03.

He and his wife had two sons and an adopted daughter.

See also
 List of Otago representative cricketers

References

External links
 

1871 births
1944 deaths
New Zealand cricketers
Canterbury cricketers
Otago cricketers
Wellington cricketers
Cricketers from Dunedin